Eastland is a neighborhood in northeast Lexington, Kentucky, United States. Its boundaries are I-75 to the east, New Circle Road to the west, Winchester Road to the south, and abandoned railroad tracks to the north.

Neighborhood statistics
 Area: 
 Population: 4,659
 Population density: 2,933 people per square mile
 Median household income: $43,249

References

Neighborhoods in Lexington, Kentucky